Caroline (CJ) Carver (born October 1959 in London) was born in the UK before moving to Australia where she lived for ten years.  She worked in publishing as a book rep and marketing manager for Transworld Publishers; and when she took time off, it was to backpack through South-East Asia.  Carver has been a travel writer and long-distance rally driver, driving from London to Saigon to Cape Town and covering 14,000 miles on the Inca Trail.  Carver is a founding judge of the Women's World Car of The Year Award.

Carver's first novel, Blood Junction, won the CWA Debut Dagger was shortlisted in the USA for the Barry Award, and was selected by Publishers Weekly as one of the best mystery books of the year.
Spare Me The Truth (published 2016) was nominated for the Ngaio Marsh Award in 2017. She has written nine more novels which have been published in the UK, USA, and has been translated into over sixteen languages. She lives with her husband near Bath, England.

Bibliography
 2001 — Blood Junction
 2003 — Dead Heat
 2004 — Black Tide
 2005 — Beneath The Snow
 2007 — Gone Without Trace
 2009 — Back With Vengeance
 2010 — The Honest Assassin
 2016 — Spare Me The Truth
 2017 — Tell Me A Lie
 2018 — Know Me Now
 2019 — Over Your Shoulder
 2019 — Cold Echo
 2020 — Deep Black Lies
 2020 — The Snow Thief
 2021 — Scare Me to Death
 2022 — 100 Ways to Write a Book

References

External links
 Official Website

1959 births
Living people
British thriller writers
British women novelists
21st-century British novelists
21st-century British women writers
Women thriller writers